Painterly Realism of a Peasant Woman in Two Dimensions, more commonly known as Red Square, is a 1915 painting by Kazimir Malevich.

The painting is of a red quadrilateral on a white field. According to New York Times art critic Grace Gluek, the "Peasant Woman" of the title of the work is represented in the color red of traditional Russian religious icon paintings.

Red Square is currently in the collection of the Russian Museum.

References

1915 paintings
Suprematism (art movement)
Paintings by Kazimir Malevich
Collections of the Russian Museum